The Best Families (Spanish: Las mejores familias) is a 2020 Peruvian-Colombian black comedy-drama film written and directed by Javier Fuentes-León.

Synopsis 
Luzmila and Peta are two sisters who work as maids for Alicia and Carmen, two lady aristocrats from Peru. They are considered part of the family or, at least, that is what it seems. But one day, while the city is taken over by violent protests, a birthday celebration brings together all the members of the families. A secret long kept by both families is revealed, thus bursting the bubble of their perfect aristocratic world forever.

Cast 

 Tatiana Astengo as Luzmila
 Gabriela Velasquez as Peta
 Staple Paola as Alicia
 Augusto Mazzarelli as Ferdinand
 Yiliana Chong as Florentyna
 Lizet Chavez as Sandra
 Giovanni Ciccia as Alvaro
 Jely Reategui as Merge
 Vanessa Saba as Carolina
 Gracia Olayo as Carmen
 Marco Zunino as Mariano
 Roberto Cano as Jano

Release 
The Best Families premiered in mid-October 2020 at the 15th Rome International Film Festival as part of the Official Competition and as an Official Selection at the 25th Busan International Film Festival. It premiered in Colombian theaters on August 26, 2021, and on November 4, 2021, in Peruvian theaters.

Awards 

 Winner of the Jury Special Mention award at the 21st edition of the Havana New York Film Festival.
 Official selection to compete for the Ariel Award and Goya Awards.

References

External links 

 

2020 films
2020 comedy-drama films
2020 black comedy films
2020 LGBT-related films
2020s Spanish-language films
Peruvian black comedy films
Peruvian comedy-drama films
Peruvian LGBT-related films
Peruvian mystery films
Colombian black comedy films
Colombian comedy-drama films
Colombian LGBT-related films
2020s Peruvian films
Films directed by Javier Fuentes-León
Films about families
Films about social class
Films set in Peru
2020s Colombian films